Alif Alif Atoll (also known as Northern Ari Atoll or Ari Atholhu Uthuruburi) is an administrative division of the Maldives. It was created on March 1, 1984, combining northern section of Ari Atoll, the small Rasdhukuramathi Atoll, and the isolated island of Thoddoo. Many of the islands in this atoll have been inhabited since ancient times and have archaeological remains from the Maldivian Buddhist period.

The separation of Ari Atoll (formerly Alifu Atoll) into a Northern and a Southern section has formed the two most recent administrative divisions of the Maldives, namely Alifu Alifu Atoll and Alifu Dhaalu Atoll.

Geography
The North Ari Atoll administrative division consists of the northern part of the geographic or natural atoll Ari Atoll (described as Northern Ari Atoll in this context to differentiate from the official name of the administrative division), Rasdhukuramathi Atoll and Thoddoo Island. The atolls consists of Inhabited Islands and Uninhabited Island, a definition which includes resort islands, airport islands and industrial islands.

Inhabited islands

Maalhos: Maalhos is geographically the westernmost island of the Atoll and the second-most westerly inhabited island of the Maldives after Maamakunudhoo. Vajrayana Buddhist remains have been found on this island.

Rasdhoo: Rasdhoo is the capital island of the North Ari Atoll administrative division. It has ferry connections with Malé as well as the other inhabited islands of the atoll. The island has several guesthouses catering to tourists visiting inhabited islands rather than resort islands.

Resort islands
Resort islands are classified as Uninhabited Islands which have been converted to become resorts. The following are the resort islands, with the official name of the resort.

It is a holiday resort with 91 rooms and an excellent snorkelling reef. A large number of workers at the resort come from Sri Lanka and India. The island is linked to Male by seaplane services.

Other uninhabited islands

Gallery

References

 Divehi Tārīkhah Au Alikameh. Divehi Bahāi Tārikhah Khidmaiykurā Qaumī Markazu. Reprint 1958 edn. Malé 1990. 
 Divehiraajjege Jōgrafīge Vanavaru. Muhammadu Ibrahim Lutfee. G.Sōsanī.
 Xavier Romero-Frias, The Maldive Islanders, A Study of the Popular Culture of an Ancient Ocean Kingdom. Barcelona 1999.

 
Atolls of the Maldives
Administrative atolls of the Maldives